Hobart (Nuennonne/Palawa kani: nipaluna) is the capital and most populous city of the Australian island state of Tasmania. Home to almost half of all Tasmanians, it is the least-populated Australian state capital city, and second-smallest if territories are taken into account, before Darwin, Northern Territory. Hobart is located in Tasmania's south-east on the estuary of the River Derwent, making it the most southern of Australia's capital cities. Its skyline is dominated by the  kunanyi/Mount Wellington, and its harbour forms the second-deepest natural port in the world, with much of the city's waterfront consisting of reclaimed land. The metropolitan area is often referred to as Greater Hobart, to differentiate it from the City of Hobart, one of the five local government areas that cover the city. It has a mild maritime climate.

The city lies on country which was known by the local Mouheneener people as nipaluna, a name which includes surrounding features such as kunanyi/Mt. Wellington and timtumili minanya (River Derwent). Prior to British settlement, the land had been occupied for possibly as long as 35,000 years by the semi-nomadic Mouheneener people, a sub-group of the Nuennone, or "South-East tribe".

Founded in 1804 as a British penal colony, Hobart is Australia's second-oldest capital city after Sydney, New South Wales. Whaling quickly emerged as a major industry in the area, and for a time Hobart served as the Southern Ocean's main whaling port. Penal transportation ended in the 1850s, after which the city experienced periods of growth and decline. The early 20th century saw an economic boom on the back of mining, agriculture and other primary industries, and the loss of men who served in the world wars was counteracted by an influx of immigration. Despite the rise in migration from Asia and other non-English speaking regions, Hobart's population remains predominantly ethnically Anglo-Celtic, and has the highest percentage of Australian-born residents among Australia's capital cities.

Today, Hobart is the financial and administrative hub of Tasmania, serving as the home port for both Australian and French Antarctic operations and acting as a tourist destination, with over 1.192 million visitors in 2011–12. Well-known drawcards include its convict-era architecture, Salamanca Market and the Museum of Old and New Art (MONA), the Southern Hemisphere's largest private museum.

History

The first European settlement began in 1803 as a military camp at Risdon Cove on the eastern shores of the River Derwent, amid British concerns over the presence of French explorers. In 1804, along with the military, settlers and convicts from the abandoned Port Phillip settlement, the camp at Risdon Cove was moved by Captain David Collins to a better location at the present site of Hobart at Sullivans Cove. The city, initially known as Hobart Town or Hobarton, was named after Lord Hobart, the British Secretary of State for war and the colonies.

The area's indigenous inhabitants were members of the semi-nomadic Mouheneener tribe. Violent conflict with the European settlers, and the effects of diseases brought by them, dramatically reduced the Aboriginal population, which was rapidly replaced by free settlers and the convict population. Charles Darwin visited Hobart Town in February 1836 as part of the Beagle expedition. He writes of Hobart and the Derwent estuary in The Voyage of the Beagle:

"...The lower parts of the hills which skirt the bay are cleared; and the bright yellow fields of corn, and dark green ones of potatoes, appear very luxuriant... I was chiefly struck with the comparative fewness of the large houses, either built or building. Hobart Town, from the census of 1835, contained 13,826 inhabitants, and the whole of Tasmania 36,505."

The River Derwent was one of Australia's finest deepwater ports and was the centre of South Seas whaling and sealing trades. The settlement rapidly grew into a major port, with allied industries such as shipbuilding.

Hobart Town became a city on 21 August 1842, and was renamed Hobart from the beginning of 1881.

During the mid 20th century, the state and local governments invested in building Hobart's reputation as a tourist attraction - in 1956 the Lanherne Airport (now Hobart International Airport) was opened. Australia's first legal casino, Wrest Point Hotel Casino opened in 1973. Despite these successes, Hobart faced significant challenges during the 20th century, including the 1967 Tasmanian fires, which claimed 62 lives in Hobart itself and destroyed over 1200 homes, and the 1975 Tasman Bridge disaster, when a bulk ore carrier collided with and destroyed the concrete span bridge that connected the city to its eastern suburbs.

In the 21st century, Hobart benefited as Tasmania's economy recovered from the 1990s recession, and the city's long-stagnant population growth began to reverse. A period of significant growth has followed, including the redevelopment of the former Macquarie Point railyards, Parliament Square, and new hotel developments throughout the city.

Geography

Topography

Hobart is located on the estuary of the River Derwent in the state's south-east. Geologically Hobart is built predominantly on Jurassic dolerite around the foothills interspersed with smaller areas of Triassic siltstone and Permian mudstone. Hobart extends along both sides of the River Derwent; on the western shore from the Derwent valley in the north through the flatter areas of Glenorchy which rests on older Triassic sediment and into the hilly areas of New Town, Lenah Valley. Both of these areas rest on the younger Jurassic dolerite deposits, before stretching into the lower areas such as the beaches of Sandy Bay in the south, in the Derwent estuary. South of the Derwent estuary lies Storm Bay and the Tasman Peninsula.

The Eastern Shore also extends from the Derwent valley area in a southerly direction hugging the Meehan Range in the east before sprawling into flatter land in suburbs such as Bellerive. These flatter areas of the eastern shore rest on far younger deposits from the Quaternary. From there the city extends in an easterly direction through the Meehan Range into the hilly areas of Rokeby and Oakdowns, before reaching into the tidal flatland area of Lauderdale.

Hobart has access to a number of beach areas including those in the Derwent estuary itself; Long Beach, Nutgrove Beach, Bellerive Beach, Cornelian Bay, Kingston, and Howrah Beaches as well as many more in Frederick Henry Bay such as; Seven Mile, Roaches, Cremorne, Clifton, and Goats Beaches.

Climate
Hobart has a mild temperate oceanic climate (Köppen: Cfb). Annually, Hobart receives only 40.8 clear days without rain. Compared to other major Australian cities, Hobart has the fewest daily average hours of sunshine, with only 5.9 hours per day. However, during the summer it has the same hours of daylight of any Australian city, with 15.3 hours on the summer solstice. By global standards, Hobart has cool summers and mild winters for its relative latitude, being heavily influenced by its seaside location.

Although Hobart itself rarely receives snow during the winter due to the foehn effect created by the Central Highlands (the city's geographic position causes a rainshadow), the adjacent Kunanyi/Mount Wellington is frequently seen with a snowcap throughout the year including in summer. During the 20th century, the city itself has received snowfalls at sea level on average only once every 5 years; however, outer suburbs lying higher on the slopes of Mount Wellington receive snow more often, owing to the more exposed position coupled with them resting at higher altitude. These snow-bearing winds often carry on through Tasmania and Victoria to the Snowy Mountains in Victoria and southern New South Wales.

Demographics

At the 2021 census, there were 247,068 people in the Greater Hobart. The City of Hobart local government area had a population of 55,077.

As of 2021, the median weekly household income was $1,542, compared with $1,746 nationally.

18.1% of households total weekly income is less than $650 week, while 18.9% of households weekly income exceeds $3,000. This compares to national rates of 16.5% and 24.3% respectively.

35.4% of renting households, and 10.3% of owned households with a mortgage experience housing stress, where rent or mortgage repayments exceed 30% of income.

At the 2016 census, The most common occupation categories were professionals (22.6%), clerical and administrative workers (14.7%), technicians and trades workers (13.3%), community and personal service workers (12.8%), and managers (11.3%).

Ancestry and immigration

4.5% of the population (11,216 people) are Indigenous Australians (Aboriginal Australians and Torres Strait Islanders).

At the 2021 census, the most commonly nominated ancestry groups include:

23.4% of the population was born overseas at the 2021 census. The five largest groups of overseas-born were from England (3.3%), Mainland China (2.2%), Nepal (1.7%), India (1.6%) and New Zealand (0.9%).

Language
At the 2021 census, 82.6% of the population spoke only English at home. The other languages most commonly spoken at home were Mandarin (2.6%), Nepali (1.8%), Punjabi (0.7%), Cantonese (0.5%) and Vietnamese (0.4%).

Religion
In the 2021 census, 49.9% of Greater Hobart residents specified no religion. Christianity comprised the largest religious affiliation (37.1%), with the largest denominations being Anglicanism (14.1%) and Catholicism (14.1%). Hinduism (2.6%), Buddhism (1.3%), Islam (1.3%) and Sikhism (0.6%) constitute the remaining largest religious affiliations.

Hobart has a small community of 456 members of the Church of Jesus Christ of Latter-day Saints, with meetinghouses in Glenorchy, Rosny, and Glen Huon. There is also a synagogue, with a Jewish community of 203 people. Hobart has a Baháʼí community, with a Baháʼí Centre of Learning, located within the city. In 2013, Hillsong Church established a Hillsong Connect campus in Hobart.

Economy

Shipping is significant to the city's economy. Hobart is the home port for the Antarctic activities of Australia and France. The port loads around 2,000 tonnes of Antarctic cargo a year for the Australian research vessel Nuyina (previously the Aurora Australis). The city is also a popular cruise ship destination during the summer months, with 47 such ships docking during the course of the 2016–17 summer season.

The city also supports many other industries. Major local employers include catamaran builder Incat, zinc refinery Nyrstar, Cascade Brewery and Cadbury's Chocolate Factory, Norske Skog and Wrest Point Casino. The city also supports a host of light industry manufacturers, as well as a range of redevelopment projects, including the $689 million Royal Hobart Hospital Redevelopment – standing as the states largest ever Health Infrastructure project.

Tourism is a significant part of the economy, with visitors coming to the city to explore its historic inner suburbs and nationally acclaimed restaurants and cafes, as well as its vibrant music and nightlife culture. The two major draw-cards are the weekly market in Salamanca Place, and the Museum of Old and New Art. The city is also used as a base from which to explore the rest of Tasmania.

The last 15–20 years have seen Hobart's wine industry thrive as many vineyards have developed in countryside areas outside of the city in the Coal River Wine Region and D'Entrecasteaux Channel, including Moorilla Estate at Berriedale one of the most awarded vineyards in Australia.

Antarctic gateway

Hobart is an Antarctic gateway city, with geographical proximity to East Antarctica and the Southern Ocean. Infrastructure is provided by the port of Hobart for scientific research and cruise ships, and Hobart International Airport supports an Antarctic Airlink to Wilkins Runway at Casey Station. Hobart is a logistics point for the French icebreaker L'Astrolabe.

Hobart is the home port for the Australian and French Antarctic programs, and provides port services for other visiting Antarctic nations and Antarctic cruise ships. Antarctic and Southern Ocean expeditions are supported by a specialist cluster offering cold climate products, services and scientific expertise. The majority of these businesses and organisations are members of the Tasmanian polar network, supported in part by the Tasmanian State Government.

Tasmania has a high concentration of Antarctic and Southern Ocean scientists. Hobart is home to the following Antarctic and Southern Ocean scientific institutions:
 Australian Antarctic Division
 Commission for the Conservation of Antarctic Marine Living Resources (CCAMLR)
 Agreement on the Conservation of Albatrosses and Petrels (ACAP)
 The University of Tasmania (UTAS) – expertise in Antarctic and Southern Ocean science and research
 Institute for Marine and Antarctic Studies (IMAS) (established by UTAS)
Integrated Marine Observing System (IMOS)
Antarctic Climate and Ecosystems Cooperative Research Centre (ACE-CRC)
International Antarctic Institute (IAI) (hosted by UTAS)
Southern Ocean Observing System (hosted by UTAS/ IMAS)
 CSIRO Marine and Atmospheric Research

Tourism

Hobart serves as a focal point and mecca for tourism in the state of Tasmania. Hobart has been a significant tourist destination for many years, however tourism has evolved to a core industry in the last decade. This process has been termed the "MONA Effect" - referring to the significant influence of the Museum of New and Old Art (MONA), the Southern Hemisphere's largest private museum, on the local tourist economy - compared to the effect of the Guggenheim on Bilbao. Since opening in 2011, MONA had received 2.5 million visitors by 2022 and has helped establish a number of art and food venues and events, including MONA FOMA, and the winter festivals of Mid-Winter Fest and Dark Mofo. 27% of visitors to Tasmania visit the museum.

In 2016, Hobart received 1.8 million visitors, surpassing both Perth and Canberra, tying equally with Brisbane. Visitor numbers reached a low of 744,200 in 2021, primarily as a result of the Covid-19 Pandemic, with expectations that numbers would return to normal by 2023.

Many local tourist attractions focuses on the convict history of Hobart, the city's historic architecture, art experiences, and food and alcohol experiences. Hobart is home to a significant number of nationally known restaurants, boutique alcohol producers, including Sullivans Cove Wiskey, which won world's best single malt in 2014, boutique hotels, and art experiences. Other significant tourist attractions include Australia's second oldest botanic gardens, the Royal Tasmanian Botanical Gardens, which holds extensive significant plant collections, a range of public and private museums including the Tasmanian Museum and Art Gallery, and kunanyi/Mount Wellington, one of the dominant features of Hobart's skyline. At , the mountain has its own ecosystems, is rich in biodiversity and plays a large part in determining the local weather.

Architecture

Hobart is known for its well-preserved Georgian and Victorian architecture, giving the city a distinctly "Old World" feel. For locals, this became a source of discomfiture about the city's convict past, but is now a draw card for tourists. Regions within the city centre, such as Salamanca Place and Battery Point, contain many of the city's heritage-listed buildings. Historic homes and mansions also exist in the suburbs, much of the inner-city neighbourhoods are dotted with weatherboard cottages and two-storey Victorian houses. Hobart has a signfiicant body of notable buildings, including the Cascades Female Factory, one of the UNESCO Australian Convict Sites, the Hobart Synagogue, which is the oldest synagogue in Australia and a rare surviving example of an Egyptian Revival synagogue, Hadley's Orient Hotel, on Hobart's Murray Street, which is the oldest continuously operating hotel in Australia, and the Theatre Royal, the oldest continually operating theatre in Australia.

Kelly's Steps were built in 1839 by shipwright and adventurer James Kelly to provide a short-cut from Kelly Street and Arthur Circus in Battery Point to the warehouse and dockyards district of Salamanca Place. In 1835, John Lee Archer designed and oversaw the construction of the sandstone Customs House, facing Sullivans Cove. Completed in 1840, it was used as Tasmania's parliament house, and is now commemorated by a pub bearing the same name (built in 1844) which is frequented by yachtsmen after they have completed the Sydney to Hobart yacht race.

Hobart is also home to many historic churches. The Scots Church (formerly known as St Andrew's) was built in Bathurst Street from 1834 to 1836, and a small sandstone building within the churchyard was used as the city's first Presbyterian Church. The Salamanca Place warehouses and the Theatre Royal were also constructed in this period. The Greek revival St George's Anglican Church in Battery Point was completed in 1838, and a classical tower, designed by James Blackburn, was added in 1847. St Joseph's was built in 1840. St David's Cathedral, Hobart's first cathedral, was consecrated in 1874.

Hobart has very few high-rise buildings in comparison to other Australian capital cities. This is partly a result of height limits imposed due to Hobart's proximity to the River Derwent and Mount Wellington.

Culture

Arts and entertainment

Hobart is home to Australia's oldest continuously operating theatre, the Theatre Royal, built in 1837. Other theatres in the city include the Playhouse theatre, the Backspace Theatre, and many smaller stage theatres.

The Tasmanian Symphony Orchestra is based at the Federation Concert Hall on the city's waterfront. The Federation Concert Hall also hosts the University of Tasmania's Australian International Symphony Orchestra Institute (AISOI) which fosters advanced young musicians from across Australia and internationally.

Australia's first novel, Quintus Servinton, was published in 1831 by convict Henry Savery and published in Hobart, where he wrote the work during his imprisonment. A generally autobiographical work, it's the story of what happens to a well educated man from a relatively well to do family, who makes poor choices in life. Mary Leman Grimstone, whose book Woman's Love was written in Hobart between 1826 and 1829, holds the distinction of being the first non-biographical Australian novel. It was printed in London in 1832.

The city has also long been home to a thriving classical, jazz, folk, punk, hip-hop, electro, metal and rock music scene. Internationally recognised musicians such as metal acts Striborg and Psycroptic, indie-electro bands The Paradise Motel and The Scientists of Modern Music, singer-songwriters Sacha Lucashenko (of The Morning After Girls), Michael Noga (of The Drones), and Monique Brumby, two-thirds of indie rock band Love of Diagrams, post punk band Sea Scouts, theremin player Miles Brown, blues guitarist Phil Manning (of blues-rock band Chain), power-pop group The Innocents, and TikTok artist Kim Dracula all originated in Hobart. In addition, founding member of Violent Femmes, Brian Ritchie, now calls Hobart home, and has formed a local band, The Green Mist. Ritchie also curates the annual international arts festival MONA FOMA, held at Salamanca Place's waterfront venue, Princes Wharf, Shed No. 1. Hobart hosts many significant festivals including summer's Taste of Tasmania celebrating local produce, wine and music, Dark Mofo marking the winter solstice, Australia's premier festival celebration of voice the Festival of Voices, and Tasmania's biennial international arts festival Ten Days On The Island. Other festivals, including the Hobart Fringe Festival, Hobart Summer Festival, Southern Roots Festival, the Falls Festival in Marion Bay and the Soundscape Festival also capitalise on Hobart's artistic communities.

Hobart is home to the Tasmanian Museum and Art Gallery. The Meadowbank Estate winery and restaurant features a floor mural by Tom Samek, part funded by the Federal Government. The Museum of Old and New Art (MONA) opened in 2011 to coincide with the third annual MONA FOMA festival. The multi-storey MONA gallery was built directly underneath the historic Sir Roy Grounds courtyard house, overlooking the River Derwent. This building serves as the entrance to the MONA Gallery. The Lady Franklin Gallery became Australia's first privately funded museum when established by Lady Jane Franklin in 1843. The Art Society of Tasmania has operated from the premises since 1949.

Hobart has a growing street art scene thanks to a program called Hobart Walls, which was launched in association with the Vibrance Festival, an annual mural-painting event. The City of Hobart and Vibrance Festival launched Hobart's first legal street art wall in Bidencopes Lane in 2018, allowing any artist to paint there, on any day of the week, provided they sign up for a permit and paint between 9am and 10pm.

Designed by the prolific architect Sir Roy Grounds, the 17-storey Wrest Point Hotel Casino in Sandy Bay, opened as Australia's first legal casino in 1973.

The city's nightlife primarily revolves around Salamanca Place, the waterfront area, Elizabeth St in North Hobart and Sandy Bay, but popular pubs, bars and nightclubs exist around the city as well. Major national and international music events are usually held at the Derwent Entertainment Centre, or the Casino. Popular restaurant strips include Elizabeth Street in North Hobart, and Salamanca Place near the waterfront. These include numerous ethnic restaurants including Chinese, Thai, Greek, Pakistani, Italian, Indian and Mexican. The major shopping street in the CBD is Elizabeth Street, with the pedestrianised Elizabeth Mall and the General Post Office.

Close Shave, one of Australia's longest serving male a cappella quartets, is based in Hobart.

Events

Hobart is internationally famous among the yachting community as the finish of the Sydney to Hobart Yacht Race which starts in Sydney on Boxing Day (the day after Christmas Day). The arrival of the yachts is celebrated as part of the Hobart Summer Festival, a food and wine festival beginning just after Christmas and ending in mid-January. The Taste of Tasmania is a major part of the festival, where locals and visitors can taste fine local and international food and wine.

The city is the finishing point of the Targa Tasmania rally car event, which has been held annually in April since 1991.

The annual Tulip Festival at the Royal Tasmanian Botanical Gardens is a popular Spring celebration in the city.

The Australian Wooden Boat Festival is a biennial event held in Hobart celebrating wooden boats. It is held concurrently with the Royal Hobart Regatta, which began in 1830 and is therefore Tasmania's oldest surviving sporting event.

Sport

Most professional Hobart-based sports teams represent Tasmania as a whole rather than exclusively the city.

Cricket is a popular game of the city. The Tasmanian Tigers cricket team plays its home games at the Bellerive Oval on the Eastern Shore. A new team, Hobart Hurricanes represent the city in the Big Bash League. Bellerive Oval has been the breeding ground of some world class cricket players including the former Australia captain Ricky Ponting.

Despite Australian rules football's huge popularity in the state of Tasmania, the state does not have a team in the Australian Football League. However, a bid for an Tasmanian AFL team is a popular topic among football fans. The State government is one of the potential sponsors of such a team. Local domestic club football is still played. Tasmanian State League football features five clubs from Hobart, and other leagues such as Southern Football League and the Old Scholars Football Association are also played each Winter.

The city has two local rugby league football teams (Hobart Tigers and South Hobart Storm) that compete in the Tasmanian Rugby League.

Tasmania is not represented by teams in the NRL, Super Rugby, ANZ Championship or A-League. However, the Tasmania JackJumpers entered the NBL in the 2021/22 season. The Hobart Chargers also represent Hobart in the second-tier South East Australian Basketball League. Besides the bid for an AFL club which was passed over in favour of a second Queensland team, despite several major local businesses and the Premier pioneering for a club, there is also a Hobart bid for entry into the A-League.

The Tassie Tigers field men's and women's representative sides in the national hockey league, Hockey One (which replaced the Australian Hockey League in 2019). They play their home matches at the Tasmanian Hockey Centre in New Town near Cornelian Bay, which features three synthetic hockey pitches that have also hosted international competition such as the Men's FIH Pro League as recently as 2019. The Kookaburras current co-Captain and games record holder, Eddie Ockenden, is a product of the Hobart-based club North West Graduates.

The city co-hosted the basketball FIBA Oceania Championship 1975, where the Australian national basketball team won the gold medal.

Media

Five free-to-air television stations service Hobart:
 ABC Tasmania (ABT)
 SBS Tasmania (SBS)
 Southern Cross Seven Tasmania (TNT) – Seven Network affiliate
 Nine Tasmania (TVT) – Nine Network affiliate
 Tasmanian Digital Television (TDT) – Network 10 affiliate
Each station broadcasts a primary channel and several multichannels.

Hobart is served by twenty-nine digital free-to-air television channels:

 ABC
 ABC HD (ABC broadcast in HD)
 ABC TV Plus/KIDS
 ABC ME
 ABC News
 SBS
 SBS HD (SBS broadcast in HD)
 SBS Viceland
 SBS Viceland HD (SBS Viceland broadcast in HD)
 Food Network
 NITV
 7 Tasmania (on relay from Melbourne)
 7HD (Seven broadcast in HD)
 7two
 7mate
 Racing.com
 Nine (on relay from Melbourne)
 9HD (Nine broadcast in HD)
 9Gem
 9Go!
 9Life
 TVSN
 Gold
 Sky News on WIN
 10 (on relay from Melbourne)
 10 HD (TDT broadcast in HD)
 10 Bold
 10 Peach
 10 Shake

The majority of pay television services are provided by Foxtel via satellite, although other smaller pay television providers do service Hobart.

Commercial radio stations licensed to cover the Hobart market include Triple M Hobart, hit100.9 Hobart and 7HO FM. Local community radio stations include Christian radio station Ultra106five, Edge Radio and Hobart FM which targets the wider community with specialist programmes. The five ABC radio networks available on analogue radio broadcast to Hobart via 936 ABC Hobart, Radio National, Triple J, NewsRadio and ABC Classic FM. Hobart is also home to the video creation company Biteable.

Hobart's major newspaper is The Mercury, which was founded by John Davies in 1854 and has been continually published ever since. The paper is owned and operated by Rupert Murdoch's News Limited.

Government

Hobart is divided into five local government areas - three of which are designated as cities, City of Hobart, City of Glenorchy and City of Clarence,. The remaining metropolitan area is within the Municipality of Kingborough and the Municipality of Brighton. Each local government area has an elected council which manages functions delegated by the Tasmanian state government such as roads, planning, animal control and parks. Mains water and sewerage processing are serviced by TasWater, which is a state-wide authority part owned by the state government and local government areas.

Hobart is the seat of the Parliament of Tasmania, located at Parliament House, Salamanca Place, and the location of the official residence of the Governor of Tasmania, Government House. The senior sitting of the Supreme Court of Tasmania, and only sitting of the Court's appeal division, sit in Hobart.

Hobart was made the seat of government for the southern district of Tasmania (then called Van Diemen's Land), Buckingham County in 1804, with the northern half of the state separately governed from Port Dalrymple, now George Town. At the time, Van Diemen's Land remained part of the Colony of New South Wales. In 1812, the northern lieutenant governorship ceased and Hobart become de facto seat of government for the entire island. Hobart officially became capital of an independent colony of Van Diemen's Land in 1825, and the seat of responsible self government in 1850 with the Australian Constitutions Act 1850.

Infrastructure

Education

Hobart is home to the main campus of the University of Tasmania, located in Sandy Bay. On-site accommodation colleges include Christ College, Jane Franklin Hall and St John Fisher College. Other campuses are in Launceston and Burnie.

The Greater Hobart area contains 122 primary, secondary and pretertiary (College) schools distributed throughout Clarence, Glenorchy and Hobart City Councils and Kingborough and Brighton Municipalities. These schools are made up of a mix of public, catholic, private and independent run, with the heaviest distribution lying in the more densely populated West around the Hobart city core. TasTAFE operates a total of seven polytechnic campuses within the Greater Hobart area that provide vocational education and training.

Health
Royal Hobart Hospital is a major public hospital in central Hobart with 501 beds, which also serves as a teaching hospital for the University of Tasmania.

A private hospital, Hobart Private Hospital is located adjacent to it and operated by Australian healthcare provider Healthscope. The company also owns another hospital in the city, the St. Helen's Private Hospital, which features a mother-baby unit.

Transport

The only public transportation within the city of Hobart is via a network of Metro Tasmania buses funded by
the Tasmanian Government and a small number of private bus services. Like many large Australian cities, Hobart once operated passenger tram services, a trolleybus network consisting of six routes which operated until 1968. However, the tramway closed in the early 1960s. The tracks are still visible in the older streets of Hobart.

Suburban passenger trains, run by the Tasmanian Government Railways, were closed in 1974 and the intrastate passenger service, the Tasman Limited, ceased running in 1978. Recently though there has been a push from the city, and increasingly from government, to establish a light rail network, intended to be fast, efficient, and eco-friendly, along existing tracks in a North South corridor; to help relieve the frequent jamming of traffic in Hobart CBD.

The main arterial routes within the urban area are the Brooker Highway to Glenorchy and the northern suburbs, the Tasman Bridge and Bowen Bridge across the river to Rosny and the Eastern Shore. The East Derwent Highway to Lindisfarne, Geilston Bay, and Northwards to Brighton, the South Arm Highway leading to Howrah, Rokeby, Lauderdale and Opossum Bay and the Southern Outlet south to Kingston and the D'Entrecasteaux Channel. Leaving the city, motorists can travel the Lyell Highway to the west coast, Midland Highway to Launceston and the north, Tasman Highway to the east coast, or the Huon Highway to the far south.

Ferry services from Hobart's Eastern Shore into the city were once a common form of public transportation, but with lack of government funding, as well as a lack of interest from the private sector, there has been the demise of a regular commuter ferry service – leaving Hobart's commuters relying solely on travel by automobiles and buses. There is however a water taxi service operating from the Eastern Shore into Hobart which provides an alternative to the Tasman Bridge.
In 2021, State Government trialed a ferry service that operates on the Derwent between Brooke Street Pier and Bellerive. Due to the success of the trial, the ferry service was made permanent, with more than 2100 passengers in the first three weeks.

Hobart is served by Hobart International Airport with flights to/from Adelaide, Auckland, Brisbane, Canberra, Gold Coast, Melbourne, Perth, Sydney, and regional destinations including the Bass Strait islands. The smaller Cambridge Aerodrome mainly serves small charter airlines offering local tourist flights. In the past decade, Hobart International Airport received a huge upgrade, with the airport now being a first class airport facility.

In 2009, it was announced that Hobart Airport would receive more upgrades, including a first floor, aerobridges (currently, passengers must walk on the tarmac) and shopping facilities. Possible new international flights to Asia and New Zealand, and possible new domestic flights to Darwin and Cairns have been proposed. A second runway, possibly to be constructed in the next 15 years, would assist with growing passenger numbers to Hobart. Hobart Control Tower may be renovated and fitted with new radar equipment, and the airport's carpark may be extended further. Also, new facilities will be built just outside the airport. A new service station, hotel and day care centre have already been built and the road leading to the airport has been maintained and re-sealed. In 2016, work began on a 500-metre extension of the existing runway in addition to a $100 million upgrade of the airport. The runway extension is expected to allow international flights to land and increase air-traffic with Antarctica. This upgrade was, in part, funded under a promise made during the 2013 federal election by the Abbott government.

On 9 August 2021, the Derwent River Ferry (owned by Roche Brothers' Navigator Group) was initiated as a year-long trial servicing between Brooke Street Pier in Hobart centre to Bellerive Pier on the eastern shore. A one-way trip takes approximately 15 minutes, and the ferry operates on all weekdays, but not weekends. It starts the day at Bellerive and departs 8 times there from 6:20am as the first time and 5:30pm as the last (40-minute intervals), before returning from Brooke St Pier at 5:50pm to Bellerive for the next day. The ferry provides a convenient alternative to crossing the Tasman Bridge, with its purpose being to reduce traffic congestion at a cost of $175.5 million. It can hold 107 passengers as well as 15 bicycle spots on-board. It is seen as a first step in diversifying Hobart's transportation infrastructure to solve traffic problems that involves taking cars off the road rather than increasing capacity.

Notable residents

Arts

 Asta, singer-songwriter
 Phillip Borsos, director and producer, best known for his films The Mean Season (1985) and One Magic Christmas (1985)
 Saroo Brierley, author of A Long Way Home, adapted into the 2016 film Lion.
 Jeanine Claes, artist, dancer, choreographer and dance teacher
 Essie Davis, actress
 Richard Flanagan, author
 Errol Flynn, Hollywood actor
 Frederick Frith, painter and photographer
 Lisa Gormley, English-born Australian actress best known for playing Bianca Scott on the Channel 7 serial drama Home and Away
 Lucky Grills, best known for portraying the unconventional detective "Bluey" Hills in the television series Bluey in 1976.
 Robert Grubb, actor
 John Harwood, writer and poet
 Ernest, Tasman and Arthur Higgins, brothers and pioneering cinematographers during the silent era
 Don Kay, Australian classical composer
 William Kermode, artist
 Constantine Koukias, Greek-Australian composer and flautist
 Louise Lovely, the first Australian motion picture actress to find success in Hollywood
 Dennis Miller, actor best known for his recurring role on Blue Heelers as Ex-Sergeant Pat Doyle (1994–2000).
 Richard Morgan, most noted for playing the long-running role of Terry Sullivan in the Australian television series The Sullivans.
 Tara Morice, actress
 Gerda Nicolson, actress
 Len Reynolds, illustrator, caricaturist, painter, cartoonist
 Glenn Richards, musician, singer, songwriter and guitarist with Augie March
 Brian Ritchie, musician, bassist of Violent Femmes
 Clive Sansom, poet and playwright
 Don Sharp, actor
 Michael Siberry, actor
 Jaason Simmons, actor best known for his role as life guard Logan Fowler in the TV series Baywatch
 Freya Stafford, actress who has appeared on TV programs such as Head Start and White Collar Blue and the 2010 horror film The Clinic
 Will Upson, pianist and composer, immigrated from the UK
 Amali Ward, Australian Idol Season 2 finalist
 Charles Woolley, photographer and artist

Sports
 Darrel Baldock - Australian Rules footballer. Captain of St Kilda 1966 Grand Final victory over Collingwood. Legend status in the AFL Hall of Fame.
 Scott Bowden – Australian cyclist
 Al Bourke – Australian boxer of the 1940s, and 1950s
 Josh Burdon – Australian racing driver
 Roy Cazaly – Australian rules footballer who died in 1963 in Hobart, member of the Australian Football Hall of Fame
 Adam Coleman, rugby union player
 Rodney Eade – Australian rules footballer who played 259 games for Hawthorn and the Bears, former head coach of the Western Bulldogs until Round 21, 2011 and former head coach of the Gold Coast Suns.
 David Foster – World Champion woodchopper
 Ryan Foster – Middle-distance runner and first Tasmanian to break the 4-minute mile.
 Brendon Gale – former Australian rules footballer, and is CEO of the Richmond Football Club
 Royce Hart – Australian rules footballer, member of the Australian Football Hall of Fame with legend status and member of the Team of the Century
 Peter Hudson AM – Australian rules footballer, considered one of the greatest full-forwards in the game's history, when playing for Glenorchy he kicked 616 goals in 81 games with some records stating he instead kicked 769 goals; he is also a member of the Australian Football Hall of Fame
 Peter 'Percy' Jones – Australian rules footballer, played 249 games for the Carlton Blues in the VFL
 Eddie Ockenden – midfielder and striker for Australia's national hockey team, the Kookaburras
 Tim Paine – Australian cricketer and wicketkeeper
 Alex Peroni – Australian racing driver
 Steve Randell – Australian Test cricket match umpire; convicted of 15 counts of sexual assault against nine schoolgirls 
 Jack Riewoldt – Premiership winning Australian rules footballer for Richmond, winner of the 2010 and 2012 Coleman and Jack Dyer Medal, cousin of Nick.
 Nick Riewoldt – Australian rules footballer, former captain of the St Kilda Football Club
 Ian Stewart – Australian rules footballer who played 127 games for St Kilda, including the club's first (and thus far only) Premiership in 1966; he is also a member of the Australian Football Hall of Fame with legend status and a triple Brownlow Medal winner
 Max Walker – Australian rules footballer and Australian cricketer, media commentator and motivational speaker
 Paul Williams – Australian Rules footballer who played 306 games for Collingwood and Sydney, also previously caretaker coach of the Western Bulldogs
 Cameron Wurf – Australian road cyclist and member of the Cannondale Pro Cycling Team

Others
 Elizabeth Blackburn, Nobel Prize-winning biological researcher
 Bob Brown, retired politician, former leader of the Australian Greens
 William Buckley, escaped convict who lived with the native Wathaurung people on the Bellarine Peninsula for over 30 years
 Alec Campbell, longest surviving war veteran from the Gallipoli Campaign
 Peter Conrad, academic and author, teaching at Christ Church, Oxford
 Mary Donaldson, Crown Princess of Denmark
 Helene Chung Martin, journalist and author, notable for being the first reporter of Asian descent to report on the ABC
 Bernard Montgomery, general who grew up in Hobart; served in both world wars and is famous for his victory at the battle of El Alamein
 Alexander Pearce, convict and cannibal
 Joseph Potaski, convict and first Pole to come to Australia
 Harry Smith, Officer Commanding D Company, 6 RAR during the Battle of Long Tan in the Vietnam War
 Ernest Ewart Unwin, educationist
 David Walsh, art collector and founder of the Museum of Old and New Art
 Charles Wooley, journalist, most famous for his role on Channel Nine's 60 Minutes

Sister cities
  Yaizu, Shizuoka Prefecture, Japan (1977)
  L'Aquila, Abruzzo, Italy (1980)
  Valdivia, Los Ríos, Chile (1998)
  Xi'an, Shaanxi, China (2015)
  Fuzhou, Fujian, China (2017)
  Barile, Basilicata, Italy (2009)

See also

 Hobart City Centre

Notes

References

Further reading

External links

 

 
1803 establishments in Australia
Australian capital cities
Cities in Tasmania
Coastal cities in Australia
Populated places established in 1803
Southern Tasmania